Chain-of-thought (CoT) prompting is a technique for improving the reasoning ability of large language models by prompting them to generate a series of intermediate steps that lead to the final answer of a multi-step problem. It was first proposed by Google researchers in 2022.

Large language models (LLMs) that are trained on large amounts of text using deep learning methods have been shown to be able to generate human-like outputs. While LLMs have shown impressive performance on various natural language tasks, they still face difficulties with some reasoning tasks that require logical thinking and multiple steps to solve, such as arithmetic or commonsense reasoning questions. To address this challenge, CoT prompting prompts the model to produce intermediate reasoning steps before giving the final answer to a multi-step problem.

For example, given the question “Q: The cafeteria had 23 apples. If they used 20 to make lunch and bought 6 more, how many apples do they have?”, a CoT prompt might produce steps of reasoning that mimic a train of thought like “A: The cafeteria had 23 apples originally. They used 20 to make lunch. So they had 23 - 20 = 3. They bought 6 more apples, so they have 3 + 6 = 9. The answer is 9.” This is in contrast to the output of the answer directly.

Chain-of-thought prompting has been shown to improve the performance of LLMs on average on both arithmetic and commonsense tasks compared to standard prompting methods. When applied to PaLM, a 540B parameter language model, CoT prompting significantly aided the model, allowing it to perform comparably with task-specific fine-tuned models on several tasks, even setting a new state of the art at the time on the GSM8K mathematical reasoning benchmark.

CoT prompting is an emergent property of model scale, meaning it works better with larger and more powerful language models. It is also possible to fine-tune models on CoT reasoning datasets to enhance this capability further and stimulate better interpretability.

Method
There are two main methods to elicit chain-of-thought reasoning: few-shot prompting and zero-shot prompting. The initial proposition of CoT prompting demonstrated few-shot prompting, wherein at least one example of a question paired with proper human-written CoT reasoning is prepended to the prompt. It has been discovered since, however, that it is also possible to elicit similar reasoning and performance gain with zero-shot prompting, which can be as simple as appending to the prompt the words "Let's think step-by-step". This allows for better scaling as one no longer needs to prompt engineer specific CoT prompts for each task to get the corresponding boost in performance.

Challenges
While CoT reasoning can substantially improve performance on natural language processing tasks, certain drawbacks exist. Notably, zero-shot CoT prompting has increased the likelihood of toxic output on tasks where models can make inferences about marginalized groups or harmful topics.

See also
 Large language model
 Prompt engineering
 Natural language processing

References

Natural language processing
Machine learning
Linguistics